In astronomy, the Kennicutt–Schmidt law  is an empirical relation between the surface gas density and star formation rate (SFR) in a given region.  The relation was first examined by Maarten Schmidt in a 1959 paper    where he proposed that the SFR surface density scales as some positive power  of the local gas surface density. i.e.
.

In general, the SFR surface density  is in units of solar masses per year per square parsec  and the gas surface density in grams per square parsec . All of the data used were gathered from the Milky Way, and specifically the solar neighborhood.

References

Stellar astronomy
Galaxies
Star formation